Polyipnus soelae, commonly known as the soela hatchetfish, is a species of ray-finned fish in the genus Polyipnus. It is found in Indonesia with a depth range of 300 - 520 m.

References

Sternoptychidae
Fish described in 1994